The Korean Mathematical Olympiad is a mathematical olympiad held by the Korean Mathematical Society (KMS) in Republic of Korea.

History 
In 1988, only high school students were tested and middle school students were supposed to take the 'high school exam'. From the 11th exam, the middle school students' test was introduced (JKMO, Junior Korean Mathematical Olympiad). In the 53rd International Mathematical Olympiad (IMO), the Korean delegation won 209 out of 252 out of the total score and 6 gold medals and ranked the first place for the first time in history. From then, Korean mathematicians have made outstanding achievements in advanced math research and International Mathematical Olympiad.

Business Background 
In order to obtain excellent grades in the International Mathematics Olympiad, the Korean Mathematical Society holds the Korean Mathematical Olympiad, and through the operation of the seasonal school, KMS will discover gifted students and educate them to contribute the development of mathematics, science, and engineering in Korea.

Process

The Primary Test 
The primary test, usually called PKMO, is held between May and June. The current test consists of twenty multiple-choice questions, and students have to take the test in 4 hours. The trend is to present five problems from each subject, which are number theory, geometry, algebra, and combinatorics. The awards are divided into regional and national awards, and they are divided into honorable mention, bronze award, silver award, and gold award. To take the second test, students must receive the bronze award or higher.

Summer School 
Students who have a good score in PKMO can have the opportunity to attend in the summer school. It is held between July and August, and the students sleep together for 12 days and take lectures.

Autumn Communication Lecture 
Students who have completed Summer School are subjected to the Summer Communication Lecture. They have weekly online training and performance assessments.

The Secondary Test 
The secondary test is composed of 8 questions with a narrative type. It is usually held between November and December. The test is divided in morning and afternoon time and 4 problems are given each period with a time limit of 3 hours. The trend is to present two problems from number theory, geometry, algebra, and combinatorics each. Local awards are not awarded separately and are divided into honorable mention, bronze award, silver award, and gold award.

Winter School 
Students who have a good grade in the second test is entitled to attend winter school. It is progressed for 2 weeks in early January. Every weekend, there is a Winter School Mock Examination which is similar to FKMO. It is reflected in the selection of the national team. On the days without exams, there is a professor’s lecture in morning, assistant’s problem-solving in the noon, and self-study in evening. If a student gets enough grades in the winter school mock examination, he or she will be exempted for PKMO next year.

Spring Communication Lecture 
Students who have completed Winter School are subjected to the Spring Communication Lecture for 6 weeks. They have weekly online training and performance assessments.

Asia Pacific Olympiad (APMO) 
APMO is held in March. Winter School Participants are subjected to take the test. There are 5 problems in the exam, and the awards are divided into honorable mention, bronze award, silver award, and gold award. Only up to 10 people can get an award in this exam.

The Final Test (FKMO) 
The students who have won higher than the bronze prize in the High School Level Secondary Test or those who have completed the Middle School Level Winter School are entitled to take FKMO. The exam consists of 6 questions in a narrative form. It is taken for two days at the end of March, and each day you are required to solve 3 problems in 4 hours and 30 minutes. Awards are divided into Grand Prize, Excellence Prize, and Encouragement Prize, and 13 people are selected as representative candidates. Six students are selected from the candidates to represent Korea in the IMO.

Gauss Part and Euler Part 
Since 2017, KMO has been divided into two parts: Gauss Part and Euler Part. The Gauss Part is open to all students under the age of 20 and the Euler Part is available for high school students other than science high school students.

Final representative selection process 
About 12 to 13 students (twice the number of final candidates) are selected based on the grades obtained by multiplying the grades of five tests (KMO second test, Romanian Master of Mathematics, winter school mock test, APMO, and KMO final exam) by the weights set by the Korea Math Olympiad Committee. IMO mock tests are conducted for these 12 students; based on their scores, six finalists will be selected by the Korea Mathematics Olympiad Committee. The final candidates and the target students will perform the weekend training for about 5 weeks in May, and the final representative students will hold intensive training before participation in IMO, which is held from June to July.

Medal winners in International Mathematical Olympiad

References

External links 
 The Korean Mathematical Olympiad - Official website (in Korean)
 International Mathematical Olympiad - Official website 
 Asian Pacific Mathematical Olympiad - Official website 

Education competitions in South Korea
Mathematics competitions